Vema Seamount is a seamount in the South Atlantic Ocean. The seamount was formed between 15-11 million years ago, possibly by a hotspot. 

The seamount rises high enough that its summit is at shallow depth, allowing sunlight to reach it and thus permitting the growth of kelp and algae. A number of sea animals and fish are encountered on the seamount; active fisheries existed at Vema Seamount and caused the disappearance of some animal species.

History 

Vema Seamount was discovered by the research ship RV Vema of the Lamont–Doherty Earth Observatory in 1959. Vema is one of the first seamounts to be the subject of scientific study, and the first seamount investigated by scuba divers without special equipment. Vema lies in international waters and its summit is so shallow that it is a navigation hazard to ships.

Geomorphology and geography 

The cities of Cape Town and Lüderitz lie east-southeast and northeast of Vema, respectively, with Cape Town about  distant.

The summit plateau mostly consists of hard rock, like the upper slopes, with rocky outcrops separated by sandy plains. The plateau appears to be a wave-cut platform of Pleistocene age, when sea levels were lower, and is swept by strong ocean currents.

The seafloor from which Vema rises belongs to the abyssal plain of the Cape Basin. From there, the slopes of Vema first rise steeply and feature subsidiary summits; above  depth the slopes flatten.

Geology 

Volcanic rocks such as tuff as well as calcareous aggregates are found on the plateau. Collins Point is composed of phonolite, which contains aegirine, alkali feldspar, augite and nepheline. Olivine basalt has also been found. A minimum age of 11.0 ± 0.3 has been obtained from samples taken at Collins Point by potassium-argon dating, with another age being 15 million years. Older ages have been obtained deeper on the seamount; a sample from  depth gave an age of 18 million years. Light-coloured rocks on the summit platform may constitute a former carbonate platform.

Vema is an intraplate volcano and is considered to be the present-day location of a hotspot, the Vema hotspot, although the hotspot itself may have moved farther west (by about ) since when it created the Vema Seamount. Seismic tomography has shown what may be a mantle plume underneath Vema, another theory considers the Vema hotspot is a consequence of the Tristan hotspot shedding a secondary diapir. The hotspot origin of the Vema Seamount is not universally agreed upon. Earlier volcanism caused by the Vema hotspot may have manifested itself in southern Namibia in the form of alkaline volcanics, such as the Klinghardt phonolite, the 49 million years old Dicker Willem volcanic complex and associated Tsirub nephelinites or melilites close to the mouth of the Orange River, which are 37 million years old, or even the Karoo-Ferrar large igneous province. 

The movement and strength of ocean eddies are altered when they interact with Vema Seamount, with Agulhas eddies often splitting apart at the seamount. During the ice ages, sea level drop may have exposed part of the summit platform.

Biology 

The summit of Vema Seamount is shallow enough that sunlight can reach it, resulting in the growth of various types of algae and seaweeds such as Ecklonia kelp. Such kelp covers large parts of the seamount and a coral framework makes up much of the summit platform.

A number of animals inhabit Vema, usually cryptic or encrusting animals. Ascidians, black corals, non-reef building corals including gorgonia and scleractinia, decapods, holothurians, hydroids, polyzoa, rock lobsters (Jasus tristani), sea fans and sponges live on the seamount. Other animals such as bryozoans, echinoderms, gastropods, oysters, pelecypods, serpulids and other worms have also left their traces on Vema. Rock lobsters propagate from Gough Island and Tristan da Cunha to Vema Seamount, while other species appear to originate from South Africa.

Several species appear to be endemic to Vema Seamount, including the sea snail species Austromitra rosenbergi discovered in 2015 and the sponge Strongylodesma areolata described in 1969; it is estimated that about 22-36% of all species at Vema are endemic, similar to the proportion of endemic species at other seamounts of the world. The holothurian Holothuria vemae is named after the seamount, where it was discovered in 1965-1966 as is the sea snail Trivia vemacola. Vema Seamount is the type locality for the deepwater sponge Desmacidon clavata.

A number of fish have been encountered at Vema, although most fish species appear to be pelagic species that are not directly bound to the seamount environment. Fishing operations have attracted seabirds to Vema Seamount. Euphausiids and copepods are also found in the waters, including at least one copepod that parasitizes fish. Among the fish species encountered at Vema Seamount are:
 Acantholatris monodactylus (St. Paul's fingerfin)
 Decapterus longimanus 
 Decapterus macarellus (Mackerel scad)
 Emmelichthys nitidus
 Kentrocapros rosapinto (an Indopacific species) 
 Meganthias sp. 
 Nelabrichthys ornatus 
 Polyprion americanus (Atlantic wreckfish) 
 Pristipomoides sieboldii
 Schedophilus ovalis (Imperial blackfish) 
 Seriola lalandi (Yellowtail amberjack) 
 Sphoeroides pachygaster (Blunthead puffer) 
 Thunnus albacares (Yellowfin tuna)
 Thunnus obesus (Bigeye tuna) 
 Wreckfish
 Yellowtail 

Fish on the seamount are commercially fished, with the late 1970s and 1980s seeing the initiation of Mackerel scad and tuna fishing, respectively. Rock lobsters in particular were heavily used; they disappeared from Vema Seamount after overfishing in the 1960s, briefly recovered and then disappeared again by 1981 due to renewed overfishing. The collapse of this fishery is one of the first instances of a seamount fishery collapsing, and has been cited as an example of how fisheries outside of exclusive economic zones end up ungoverned and abused. Today Vema Seamount is closed to fishery by the South East Atlantic Fisheries Organisation, and man-made debris such as crab traps and ropes can be found on Vema Seamount.

References

Sources 

 
 
 
 
 
 
 
 
 
 

Seamounts of the Atlantic Ocean
Miocene volcanoes
Fisheries protection
Natural history of South Africa
Former islands from the last glacial maximum